Driving Out a Devil is an early one-act farce by the 20th-century German dramatist Bertolt Brecht. It was written in prose, probably in 1919, and was first published in volume 13 of Brecht's Stücke. The play charts the attempts of a self-confident and manipulative Bavarian peasant boy to outwit the vigilant parents of a girl of his village. Ronald Hayman suggests that this play dramatises most clearly Brecht's own ability to influence people.

References

Sources

 Brecht, Bertolt. 1994. Collected Plays: One. Ed. John Willett and Ralph Manheim. Bertolt Brecht: Plays, Poetry, Prose Ser. London: Methuen. .
 Hayman, Ronald. 1983. Brecht: A Biography. London: Weidenfeld & Nicolson. .
 Thomson, Peter and Glendyr Sacks, eds. 1994. The Cambridge Companion to Brecht. Cambridge Companions to Literature Ser. Cambridge: Cambridge University Press. .
 Willett, John. 1967. The Theatre of Bertolt Brecht: A Study from Eight Aspects. Third rev. ed. London: Methuen, 1977. .
 Willett, John and Ralph Manheim. 1970. Introduction. In Collected Plays: One by Bertolt Brecht. Ed. John Willett and Ralph Manheim. Bertolt Brecht: Plays, Poetry and Prose Ser. London: Methuen. . vii–xvii.

1919 plays
Plays by Bertolt Brecht
One-act plays